Selsius Gebze (born August 8, 1985 in Papua) is an Indonesian footballer who plays as a goalkeeper for Indonesian football club Persipura Jayapura.

External links
 
 Profile - Selsius Gebze

1985 births
Living people
Papuan people
Persidafon Dafonsoro players
Sriwijaya F.C. players
Indonesian footballers
Liga 1 (Indonesia) players
Association football goalkeepers
Persipura Jayapura players
Sportspeople from Papua